Brandt William Jobe (born August 1, 1965) is an American professional golfer who currently plays on the PGA Champions Tour.  He has also played on the PGA Tour, Nationwide Tour and the Japan Golf Tour.

Early life and amateur career
Jobe was born in Oklahoma City, Oklahoma. He attended UCLA where he was a member of the 1988 NCAA Division I Men's Championship winning team.

Professional career
Jobe turned professional in 1988.

In 1990, Jobe led the order of merit on the Canadian Tour. He won membership of the PGA Tour for 1991 via Qualifying School, but only made five cuts that year. After a few unsettled seasons, during which he won the 1995 Asia Golf Circuit Order of Merit, he established himself on the Japan Golf Tour, where he played from 1995 to 1999 and won six tournaments. He returned to the PGA Tour as special temporary member in September 1999. He has played steadily despite a freak accident in his garage at home.  After slicing his hand and severing several fingers with a shattered push broom, Jobe had significant hand and wrist surgery in 2003. He never won on the PGA Tour, but has tied for second place four times, including two in 2005 when he played on a major medical exemption.

Jobe has featured in the top 50 of the Official World Golf Rankings.

Jobe finished 30th on the Nationwide Tour in 2010, which was not enough for a PGA Tour Card, but exempted him through the final stage of Q School, where he finished tied for sixth and earned his 2011 card. In June 2011, Jobe achieved his best finish in six years when he tied for second at the Memorial Tournament, one stroke behind Steve Stricker.

Jobe won the Champions Tour qualifying school to earn his tour card for 2016.  On June 11 2017, he recorded his first Champions Tour victory at the Principal Charity Classic with a 14-under-par score of 202.

On August 25, 2019, Jobe won his second PGA Tour Champions victory at the Boeing Classic.

Personal life
Jobe and his wife, Jennifer have a son and a daughter together. Their son, Jackson, was selected third overall by the Detroit Tigers in the 2021 Major League Baseball draft.

Professional wins (15)

Japan Golf Tour wins (6)

Japan Golf Tour playoff record (3–0)

Asia Golf Circuit wins (4)
1994 Thailand Open
1995 Sabah Masters, Bali Open, Maekyung Open

Canadian Tour wins (2)

Other wins (1)
1992 Colorado Open

PGA Tour Champions wins (2)

Playoff record
PGA Tour playoff record (0–1)

Results in major championships

CUT = missed the halfway cut
"T" indicates a tie for a place.

Summary

Most consecutive cuts made – 4 (2001 U.S. Open – 2006 Masters)
Longest streak of top-10s – 0

Results in The Players Championship

CUT = missed the halfway cut
"T" indicates a tie for a place

Results in World Golf Championships

1Cancelled due to 9/11

QF, R16, R32, R64 = Round in which player lost in match play
"T" = Tied
NT = No tournament

See also
1990 PGA Tour Qualifying School graduates
2010 PGA Tour Qualifying School graduates

References

External links

American male golfers
UCLA Bruins men's golfers
PGA Tour golfers
Japan Golf Tour golfers
PGA Tour Champions golfers
Golfers from Oklahoma
Golfers from Texas
Sportspeople from Oklahoma City
People from Southlake, Texas
1965 births
Living people